Okinawa is a 1952 American war film directed by Leigh Jason and starring Pat O'Brien, Cameron Mitchell and Richard Denning. It was produced and distributed by Columbia Pictures as a second feature.

Plot
Captain Hale commands a U.S. Naval vessel taking part in the Battle of Okinawa. The film includes genuine historical newsreel footage.

Cast
 Pat O'Brien as Lt. Cmdr. Hale
 Cameron Mitchell as 'Grip' McCleary
 Richard Denning as Lt. Phillips
 Rhys Williams as Robby Roberg
 James Dobson as Emerson
 Richard Benedict as Delgado
 Rudy Robles as Felix
 Norman Budd as Smith 
 Don Gibson as Lt. Sanders 
 George A. Cooper as Yeoman

References

External links 
 
 
 
 

1952 films
American black-and-white films
American World War II films
Pacific War films
Columbia Pictures films
1950s war drama films
American war drama films
Films directed by Leigh Jason
Films set in Okinawa Prefecture
1952 drama films
Japan in non-Japanese culture
1950s English-language films
1950s American films